Dichoropetalum alanyensis is a species of flowering plant in the carrot family from South Anatolia, Turkey. It is similar to Dichoropetalum chryseum.

References

Apioideae